Elsie is an unincorporated community in Magoffin County, Kentucky, United States.  It lies along U.S. Route 460 northwest of the city of Salyersville, the county seat of Magoffin County.  Its elevation is 850 feet (259 m).

A post office was established in Elsie in 1911, and named for the daughter of the first postmaster.

References

Unincorporated communities in Kentucky
Unincorporated communities in Magoffin County, Kentucky